Eugène Bigot (28 February 1888 – 17 July 1965) was a French composer and conductor.

Life
Bigot was born in Rennes, Brittany, and  taught at the Conservatoire de Paris where his notable pupils included Émilien Allard, Louis de Froment, Henri-Claude Fantapié, António Fortunato de Figueiredo, Karel Husa, Paul Kuentz, Jean-Bernard Pommier, Pierre Rolland, and Mikis Theodorakis.

He died in Paris.

External links
Biography (in French)
Jean-Philippe Mousnier: "Albert Wolff - Eugène Bigot", Editions l'Harmattan, 2001.

1888 births
1965 deaths
20th-century French composers
Breton musicians
French ballet composers
French male conductors (music)
French male classical composers
Conservatoire de Paris alumni
Academic staff of the Conservatoire de Paris
Officiers of the Légion d'honneur
Musicians from Rennes
20th-century French conductors (music)
20th-century French male musicians